Tsukhta (Dargwa: Цlухта) is a rural locality (a selo) in Levashinsky District, Republic of Dagestan, Russia. The population was 1,558 as of 2010. There are 9 streets.

Geography 
Tsukhta is located 15 km south of Levashi (the district's administrative centre) by road. Chuni and Barkhakent are the nearest rural localities.

Nationalities 
Dargins live there.

References 

Rural localities in Levashinsky District